Delastowice  is a village in the administrative district of Gmina Szczucin, within Dąbrowa County, Lesser Poland Voivodeship, in southern Poland.

The village has a population of 332.

References

Delastowice